Anton Melnik (born 9 January 1984, in Yekaterinburg) is a Russian film producer, known for his work in action movies.

Son of film director Aleksandr Melnik.

Filmography
 Mayak (2006)
 Mongol (2007)
 Terra Nova (2008)
 Territory (2015)

References

1984 births
Living people
Mass media people from Yekaterinburg
Russian film producers